The third and final season of the American television series Star Trek: Picard features the character Jean-Luc Picard in the year 2401 as he reunites with the former command crew of the USS Enterprise (Geordi La Forge, Worf, William Riker, Beverly Crusher, and Deanna Troi) while facing a mysterious new enemy who is hunting Picard's son. The season is produced by CBS Studios in association with Secret Hideout, Weed Road Pictures, and Roddenberry Entertainment, with Terry Matalas serving as showrunner.

Patrick Stewart stars as Picard, reprising his role from the series Star Trek: The Next Generation as well as other Star Trek media, with Jeri Ryan, Michelle Hurd, and Ed Speleers also starring. The season features guest stars who also reprise their roles from previous Star Trek media, including Stewart's Next Generation co-stars Jonathan Frakes (Riker), Gates McFadden (Crusher), LeVar Burton (La Forge), Michael Dorn (Worf), Marina Sirtis (Troi), and Brent Spiner (the android Lore). A third season of Picard was informally green-lighted by January 2020, allowing it to be filmed back-to-back with the second season. Some third-season scenes were filmed during production on the second, which began in California in February 2021, before filming segued fully to the third in September. Stewart officially announced the season soon after, and filming ended in March 2022. The return of the other Next Generation cast members was confirmed a month later. Matalas hoped to make the season a satisfying ending for Picard's story and the whole Next Generation cast.

The season premiered on the streaming service Paramount+ on February 16, 2023, and is running for 10 episodes until April 20.

Episodes

Cast and characters

Main
 Patrick Stewart as Jean-Luc Picard
 Jeri Ryan as Seven of Nine
 Michelle Hurd as Raffi Musiker
 Ed Speleers as Jack Crusher

Recurring

 Jonathan Frakes as William Riker
 Gates McFadden as Beverly Crusher
 Todd Stashwick as Liam Shaw
 Ashlei Sharpe Chestnut as Sidney La Forge
 Michael Dorn as Worf
 Amanda Plummer as Vadic

 Mica Burton as Alandra La Forge

Notable guests

 Orla Brady as Laris
 Marina Sirtis as Deanna Troi
 Thomas Dekker as Titus Rikka
 Michelle Forbes as Commander Ro Laren

 LeVar Burton as Geordi La Forge
 Brent Spiner as Lore
 Daniel Davis as Professor Moriarty

Production

Development
In February 2019, during development of the series Star Trek: Picard, star Patrick Stewart said "we are set up for possibly three years of this show". Showrunner Michael Chabon and the writers were reported in January 2020 to have begun work on a second and third season, with Terry Matalas joining them to fill the void that would be created by Chabon's planned departure later that year. CBS officially announced the second season then, but did not confirm an informal third season green-light. The latter allowed the second and third seasons to be filmed back-to-back, which helped save costs and simplify scheduling. Stewart officially announced the season in September 2021, shortly after filming had begun. By February 2022, the producers had decided to end the series with the third season. Matalas served as the sole showrunner for the season.

Writing
The third season begins just over a year after the second. It tells a new story, despite the two seasons being developed together, and Matalas said the third season was "incredibly different" from the first two. He hoped it would be a satisfying conclusion for Picard's story, and said it would be less intimate and have some "game-changing Star Trek Universe ideas". Matalas added that some elements from Star Trek: The Original Series and the films starring the Original Series cast would be used in the season to "tie some Star Trek together", including the Spacedock and boatswain's whistle from those films. The season also has references to the films' "more nautical, cat and mouse submarine-movie" ideas. Star Trek II: The Wrath of Khan (1982) was a "major touchstone" for the season, which features mind games between Picard and a new villain.

In April 2022, when it was revealed that other Star Trek: The Next Generation cast members would be starring in the season, Matalas recalled watching that series as a child and said it was "most fitting that the story of Jean-Luc Picard ends honoring the beginning, with his dearest and most loyal friends from the USS Enterprise". The producers felt the group's final appearance in the film Star Trek: Nemesis (2002) had not been a proper send off and wanted to use the final season of Picard to "send [them] off the right way", similar to what the film Star Trek VI: The Undiscovered Country (1991) had done for the Original Series cast. This was Matalas's core pitch to Stewart and the other returning actors, and he developed each of their storylines with them to avoid telling a story that they were not happy with. He aimed to create endings that also promise more story for the characters. Kurtzman said the season would take its time showing where each character is before bringing them all together, which Matalas compared to Star Wars: The Force Awakens (2015) revealing where the original Star Wars characters are after many years. Matalas also compared the season to a serialized version of a theoretical The Next Generation season eight, and said it was "passing the torch from one generation to the next" like when actors from The Original Series guest starred on The Next Generation. He suggested that a more appropriate title for the season would be Star Trek Legacy rather than Star Trek: Picard, but still felt it was "truly a Picard story".

Casting

When originally developing the series, the creative team discussed not bringing back any other characters from The Next Generation to allow Picard to stand alone and not become reliant on nostalgia. Part of this was to allow newcomers who had not seen the previous series to enjoy Picard. However, the writers wanted to be respectful to longtime fans of Star Trek and felt they were missing opportunities by not including certain characters, so they decided to add some returning guests who organically served the new story. In January 2020, Stewart said it was his hope that all of the main cast of The Next Generation would appear on Picard before the end of the series.

In April 2022, members of the Next Generation cast were confirmed to be starring in the third season with Stewart: LeVar Burton as Geordi La Forge, Michael Dorn as Worf, Jonathan Frakes as William Riker, Gates McFadden as Beverly Crusher, Marina Sirtis as Deanna Troi, and Brent Spiner. Matalas confirmed that these would not be brief cameo appearances and said all of the cast would appear together in the season. After initially avoiding bringing back the full cast, executive producer Alex Kurtzman said they had a good story reason to reunite them in the third season and the producers felt that they had earned the right to do so after the first two seasons. McFadden said she loved the story that had been written for the cast in the season, while Sirtis said they had been "cherished" by the producers in contrast to their experience on Nemesis. Burton said he would be happy if he did not portray La Forge again after getting to "put a period at the end of this sentence and close the book" on the character with this season. After Spiner decided that he would not portray his Next Generation character Data again after the first season, Matalas said he would play a "new old character that you have seen and never seen before" that connects to the plot of the third season. This was revealed in October 2022 to be a version of the android Lore, Data's evil twin.

Wil Wheaton, who starred as Wesley Crusher in The Next Generation and made a cameo appearance in the second-season finale, was not included in the season. After the second-season finale was released in May 2022, series regulars Santiago Cabrera, Alison Pill, Evan Evagora, and Isa Briones revealed that they did not return for the third season. Jeri Ryan, Michelle Hurd, and Orla Brady did return as Seven of Nine, Raffi Musiker, and Laris, respectively. Matalas said budget and time limitations meant some "hard choices" had to be made about which characters to bring back for the season, especially with the need to sign on all of the returning Next Generation actors.

Matalas stated in late May that the season's villain was portrayed by a well-known actor who had not appeared in Star Trek before, and said they had given "one of the all-time great Star Trek villain performances". That June, Burton revealed that his daughter Mica had been cast as one of La Forge's daughters in the season. In August, Matalas said there would be more "legacy characters" appearing in the season beyond the main Next Generation cast. The writers considered including a grown-up version of the Star Trek: Voyager character Naomi Wildman for a specific sequence that was ultimately deemed too expensive to film. Also that month, Denise Crosby said her Next Generation character Tasha Yar would appear in the season, despite the actress previously stating that she was not involved in the series during filming. Matalas soon confirmed that the character would appear in the season as a reference to her Next Generation role. At New York Comic-Con in October, Amanda Plummer was revealed to be portraying the season's villain, Vadic. Her father Christopher Plummer had previously played an unrelated Star Trek villain, General Chang in the film Star Trek VI: The Undiscovered Country (1991). Additionally, Daniel Davis was announced to be reprising his Next Generation role as a sentient hologram of Arthur Conan Doyle's literary character Professor Moriarty, Mica Burton's casting as La Forge's youngest daughter Alandra was confirmed, and Ashlei Sharpe Chestnut was revealed to be portraying La Forge's oldest daughter Sidney.

In January 2023, Ed Speleers was announced as playing a new series regular. This was revealed to be Jack Crusher, the son of Picard and Beverly Crusher. At the same time, Todd Stashwick was revealed to have a recurring role as the captain of the USS Titan, Liam Shaw. Stashwick previously starred in Matalas's series 12 Monkeys and also had a guest role in Star Trek: Enterprise. Other members of the Titan crew include Chestnut as helm officer Sidney La Forge, Stephanie Czajkowski as Vulcan science officer T'Veen, Joseph Lee as Bajoran tactical officer Matthew Arliss Mura, and Jin Maley as Haliian communications officer Kova Rin Esmar. Thomas Dekker, who portrayed Picard's imaginary son Thomas in the film Star Trek Generations (1994) and had a guest role in Voyager, appears as a Changeling posing as the criminal Titus Rikka.

Design
Matalas said each season of Picard would be differentiated visually, but he and production designer Dave Blass wanted the second and third seasons to return to the visual style of the Next Generation era. In April 2022, Blass announced that several crew members from Next Generation era Star Trek had returned to work on the design team for Picard: computer graphics engineer Ben Betts, visual effects producer Dan Curry, set designer Daren Dochterman, concept designer and visual effects artist Doug Drexler, starship designer John Eaves, graphic designer Monica Fedrick, graphic designer Alan Kobayashi, production designer Geoffrey Mandel, video engineer Larry Markart, computer playback supervisor Todd A. Marks, production illustrator Jim Martin, art director Karl J. Martin, and graphic designer Michael Okuda who designed the LCARS computer system for The Next Generation.

Kurtzman said Dorn's prosthetics for the Klingon character Worf would match his Next Generation appearance and not be changed to match the new Klingon designs from Star Trek: Discovery. Worf uses a new weapon in the season called a "kur'leth", which was designed by Curry who designed other Klingon weapons for The Next Generation such as the bat'leth.

The sets for the USS Stargazer from the second season were re-dressed to portray a different starship in the third, the USS Titan. The Titan previously appeared in the animated series Star Trek: Lower Decks as a Luna-class ship designed by Sean Tourangeau, but Matalas felt that design was specific to the Next Generation era and wanted to consider new designs that aligned with the Picard era's Stargazer design. He worked with Blass, Drexler, and Eaves to determine what the design could be based on potential fictional events that would impact Starfleet design decisions. They decided that some older design elements from before the Next Generation era could be brought back for the new period of scientific exploration, which led to them creating the USS Titan-A, a new version of the ship that was refit to feature Constitution-class design elements (based on the starships from the Original Series era) after the original was retired. The new ship is a Neo-Constitution- or Constitution III-class ship, and was based on Star Trek fan Bill Krause's designs for an Original Series-era Constitution-style ship called the Shangri-La-class. The season also reveals that before the Next Generation-era Luna-class Titan there was an earlier version of the ship that was Shangri-La-class. Matalas described the USS Titan-A as a "long-range workhorse of a ship. Harkening back to the Constitution-class that was designed for the long 5-year missions. It is an exploratory vessel with some serious maneuvering capabilities." He compared the use of an older-style ship to Tom Cruise's Pete "Maverick" Mitchell flying a P-51 Mustang fighter plane from the 1940s in Top Gun: Maverick (2022).

The season also introduces the SS Eleos, a former Starfleet science and medical ship that Beverly Crusher uses, as well as a new Spacedock based on the one that was first introduced in Star Trek III: The Search for Spock (1984). Matalas added that the USS Enterprise (NCC-1701-F) would have a role in the season. The last Enterprise to appear in the official timeline was the USS Enterprise-E in Nemesis; the Enterprise-F is an Odyssey-class starship that was designed by Adam Ihle for 25th-century stories in the Star Trek Online video game. Star Trek Online designer and associate art director Thomas Marrone built the digital model of the Enterprise-F, which he provided to Picard visual effects team just as he did with other starship models for the previous season.

Filming
Filming for the second season began on February 16, 2021, with some third-season scenes being filmed at the same time. Production was taking place in California where the series received tax incentives to continue filming there after the first season. The second and third seasons had one of the largest television series crews at the time with more than 450 crewmembers. Due to the COVID-19 pandemic, strict guidelines were followed on set and cast and crew members were regularly tested. Principal photography for the second season ended on September 2, and the production then segued fully into filming the third.

As with the previous seasons, filming was divided into two-episode blocks. Matalas wanted Joe Menendez, whom he worked with on 12 Monkeys, to return as a director from the second season of Picard, but Menendez was unable to due to a scheduling conflict with his series Kung Fu. Picard producing director Doug Aarniokoski and frequent Star Trek director Frakes both returned from the previous seasons, respectively directing the first two blocks of episodes. Frakes completed filming for his episodes by the end of December 2021. There was a break in filming for the Christmas holidays and production resumed on January 3, 2022, but more than 50 members of the production crew and main cast tested positive for COVID-19 on that day. Filming for the season was immediately shut down, but resumed on January 7. Dan Liu and Deborah Kampmeier directed the next two blocks of episodes, and Matalas directed the last block. He was filming the series finale by February 28. Production on the series wrapped on March 8.

Visual effects
The user interfaces for the starships were created by visual effects company Twisted Media, based on the LCARS computer system. They referenced the designs from The Next Generation and the films of that era, as well as the Star Trek: The Next Generation Technical Manual (1991) reference guide by Rick Sternbach and Michael Okuda. Okuda consulted on the company's LCARS designs, as did Drexler who also provided digital models that were integrated into the interface screens. For two episodes in the second season, Todd A. Marks and his video playback company Images on Screen used a combination of LG OLED screens and Screen Innovations' FlexGlass projection screens (paired with rear screen projectors) to display the user interfaces on set during filming. The success of the FlexGlass projection technology led to it being used much more in the third season.

Music
Stephen Barton composed the season's score, replacing Jeff Russo from the first two seasons, after working with Matalas on the series 12 Monkeys. The pair began work on the season's score by April 2022, composing new themes together including the theme for the USS Titan-A. Matalas said the music was strongly influenced by the work of composers Jerry Goldsmith and James Horner for the Star Trek films. He added that themes from four different iterations of Star Trek would be used together in the score, which Barton described as a "6 1/2 hour love letter in music" to Goldsmith, Horner, and the Next Generation composers.

Frederik Wiedmann provided additional music for the season, which Matalas said was necessary due to the scope of the score for the later episodes. At the end of July, Barton and Matalas were recording the score with an 80-person orchestra at the Eastwood Scoring Stage at Warner Bros. Studios in California. Craig Huxley contributed performances on the blaster beam, an instrument that he invented and previously played on the soundtrack of Star Trek: The Motion Picture (1979). In January 2023, Matalas said they were discussing whether to release the soundtrack before the season premiered or wait to avoid it spoiling the ending. They were unable to release the soundtrack in different volumes, as was done for other television series, due to union rules.

Marketing
Unusually for a television showrunner, Matalas was able to collaborate with the Paramount+ marketing department and editor Drew Nichols on the trailers for the season so he would be happy about how much information was released early. A teaser was released on April 5, 2022, celebrating "First Contact Day" which marks the fictional holiday when first contact between humans and aliens was made in the Star Trek universe. The teaser included the announcement of the returning Next Generation cast members with voiceover from those actors and footage of Picard looking at an old uniform. Another teaser was released during the Star Trek Universe panel at San Diego Comic-Con in July 2022, giving a first look at the returning Next Generation cast members in costume. Character posters for Stewart, Ryan, Hurd, and the returning Next Generation actors were also released.

On September 8, Stewart, Ryan, and Hurd promoted the series at a "Star Trek Day" event where the season's premiere date was announced and a new teaser introducing the USS Titan was revealed. A month later, at New York Comic-Con, the season was promoted during a Star Trek Universe panel with Stewart, Sirtis, McFadden, Dorn, Burton, Frakes, Spiner, and executive producers Matalas, Roddenberry, and Kurtzman. A new trailer was released at the panel, revealing Plummer's casting as the villain as well as the returns of Lore and Professor Moriarty. James Whitbrook at Gizmodo praised the trailer for teasing what will happen in the season beyond the nostalgic returns of the Next Generation cast that the previous teasers focused on. Whitbrook described the new trailer as "absolutely bananas", mostly because of the Lore and Moriarty reveals. At Den of Geek, John Saavedra said there was "plenty to point out" in the trailer and also highlighted those two characters. Samantha Coley at Collider said the trailer was "jam-packed with action, emotion, and new and returning characters".

A final trailer for the season was released on January 29, 2023, during the AFC Championship Game. It revealed the involvement of Speleers and Stashwick. The key art for the season was also released at that time. Ryan Britt of Inverse said the trailer "doubles-down" on the previous trailers' reveals. He felt the stakes were closer to a film than a normal season of Star Trek television, and said the end of the trailer, with the returning Next Generation characters all together, felt "momentous". Ben F. Silverio at /Film said the trailer "shines some light on the mission that brings this iconic group back together", and Whitbrook said the season looked "apocalyptic".

Release
The season premiered on Paramount+ in the United States on February 16, 2023, and is expected to run for 10 episodes until April 20. Matalas said in August 2022 that the season would be ready for release later that year and he had tried to move the premiere to Christmas 2022, but Paramount+ wanted it to be released in 2023. Each episode of Picard is broadcast in Canada by Bell Media on the same day as the Paramount+ release, on the specialty channels CTV Sci-Fi Channel (English) and Z (French) before streaming on Crave. Amazon Prime Video streams the episodes within 24 hours of their U.S. release in over 200 other countries and territories around the world.

In February 2023, Paramount made a new deal with Prime Video for the series' international streaming rights. This allowed the season to be streamed on Paramount+ in some other countries, within 24 hours of each episode's U.S. debut, alongside its Prime Video release. The first two seasons were also added to Paramount+ internationally in addition to remaining on Prime Video.

Reception

The review aggregator website Rotten Tomatoes reported a 100% approval score with an average rating of 8.6/10 based on 58 reviews. The website's critical consensus reads, "Finally getting the band back together, Picard final season boldly goes where the previous generation had gone before—and is all the better for it." Metacritic, which uses a weighted average, assigned a score of 84 out of 100 based on reviews from 15 critics, indicating "universal acclaim".

Stewart and McFadden were named TVLine "Performers of the Week" for the week of February 27, 2023, for their performances in the episode "Seventeen Seconds". The site focused on the scene in which Picard confronts Crusher about their son, saying Stewart "did some of his best work ever as Jean-Luc in those moments, and McFadden matched him beat for emotional beat... plumbing depths that Trek shows rarely attempt to reach".

References

External links
 
 

2023 American television seasons
Season 3
Picard 03